, originally known as Pingyuan, was an ironclad coastal battleship that served with the Imperial Chinese Beiyang Fleet and later the Imperial Japanese Navy. It was built by the Mawei Navy Yard near Fuzhou. Previous transliterations of its Chinese name include Ping Yuen and Ping Yuan, and an alternative transliteration of its Japanese name was Heiyen.

Service record

Beiyang Fleet

As part of the Beiyang Fleet, Pingyuan was at the Battle of the Yellow Sea/Yalu River during the First Sino-Japanese War. It was a Chinese armored cruiser built by the Mawei Navy Yard, modelled on the French . Pingyuan was firstly named Longwei, and was the first Chinese-built ironclad, though some of its components were imported from abroad. Pingyuan was part of the Beiyang Fleet.

Pingyuan fought in the Battle of the Yalu River, damaging the Japanese flagship , and was later captured as a prize of war in the siege of Weihaiwei.

Imperial Japanese Navy
After its capture in February 1895, by the Imperial Japanese Navy, Pingyuan was placed into active combat service as the Pingyuan-go on 16 March 1895 and served with the Japanese fleet through the remainder of the First Sino-Japanese War. On 21 March 1898, she was re-designated as a first-class gunboat and was officially renamed Heien in 1900 based on the Japanese language pronunciation of its original Chinese name.

During the Russo-Japanese War, Heien was assigned to the 3rd Squadron and was part of the blockading force against the Imperial Russian Navy at the Battle of Port Arthur. Heien was disabled by a naval mine at Pigeon Bay (Piegen Bay), located to the west of Port Arthur on 18 September 1904 and foundered in heavy weather later that day. It was struck from the navy list on 21 May 1905.

References
Notes

Sources
 Wright, Richard N. J., The Chinese Steam Navy 1862-1945, Chatham Publishing, London, 2000, 
 Corbett, Sir Julian. Maritime Operations In The Russo-Japanese War 1904-1905. (1994) Originally classified, and in two volumes, 
 Chesneau, Roger and Eugene M. Kolesnik (editors), All The World's Fighting Ships 1860-1905, Conway Maritime Press, 1979 reprinted 2002,

External links

1888 ships
Cruisers of the Beiyang Fleet
Ships built in China
First Sino-Japanese War naval ships of China
First Sino-Japanese War naval ships of Japan
Captured ships
Naval ships of China
Gunboats of the Imperial Japanese Navy
Russo-Japanese War naval ships of Japan
Ships sunk by mines
Shipwrecks in the Sea of Japan
Shipwrecks of the Russo-Japanese War